The Community Action Programme (CAP) also known as Support for the very long-term unemployed is a workfare programme in the United Kingdom whereby long-term unemployed people who have been unemployed for over three years must work for their benefits for six months or have them removed. It was piloted in six areas and then expanded in autumn 2012.

Criticism
The Centre for Economic and Social Inclusion thinktank have argued that rolling out the CAP scheme could be an "expensive mistake". David Simmons of the CESI has argued that "We have to be careful about a one size fits all solution for the very long-term unemployed by requiring them to work for their benefits."

See also
 Boycott Workfare
 Forced labour
 Workfare in the United Kingdom

References

Workfare in the United Kingdom